Kok Tobe ( Kök Töbe - "Blue Hill"; , Kok-Tyube) is a mountain in Almaty, Kazakhstan's largest city. Kók Tóbe Park, a popular recreation area, is on top of the mountain. The mountain's height is 1100 meters above sea level. Kok Tobe is one of the main landmarks in the city, and it is popular among visitors and tourists to Almaty.

History
Up until the 1960s, the Kok Tobe mountain was originally called Verigin. Before the Soviet Union, the hill was a favorite spot for the inhabitants of the city. During the Summer, the civilians organized May Day celebrations. At winter, it was a popular spot for skiing and sledding. Verny merchants called the mountain "Blue Hill", a name believed to originate back to medieval times. 

During the 1960s, the Ministry of Communications of the Republic issued the initiative of constructing a television broadcasting tower that would reach the whole of Kazakhstan. In 1975, the design of a new Almaty TV tower began. The project involved building a broadcasting tower that would provide coverage throughout Kazakhstan as well as become a notable monument that would be visible throughout the whole of the city. 

Engineers chose the Verigina mountain (Kok Tobe) as its location on account of high altitude (1130 meters above sea level; ~200 meters above the city). The high altitude helped the tower provide better coverage throughout the area. When designing the tower, an agreement was concluded together with the Moscow Institute of Central Research Institute of Cryogenics. The architects chosen for the project were N.G. Terziev, A.N. Savchenko and N.K. Akimov. The construction budget was 600 million rubles. The funds were allocated by the State Planning Committee of the USSR.

One of the biggest problems in the construction of the television tower was the loose soil in the area. As a result, it was decided to reduce the mass of the tower, building it from metal beams and aluminum sheathing. The height of the concrete base of the tower is 60 meters. The base weighs 45 thousand tons (with an overall design weight of 50 thousand tons). From the inside, the tower is a lattice structure made of metal beams lined with aluminum plates. In the trunk was installed two lifts.

The construction of the television tower began in 1978. The initial steps involved ramming and leveling the soil where the tower was placed. This was followed by digging a 19-meter foundation trench. Asphalt was poured under the base for waterproofing. By the end of construction, the height of the tower was 372 meters long. The height of the mast for the antennas is 114 meters. A signal of 6 TV and 4 radio channels was transmitted from the TV tower. The television tower "Koktobe" broadcast to 199 settlements.

In 2001, the television tower was reconstructed. After reconstruction, the television tower began broadcasting 14 television and 14 radio channels. In the spring of 2004, after heavy rains, mountain surfaces cracked and soil structures began to crumble, which became a threat of a landslide in the residential areas nearby. Former Almaty mayor Zamanbek Nurkadilov decided to close the area.

In summer 2004, work began on the reconstructing and strengthening the slope of Kok Tobe. At the top of mountain, illegally erected buildings (mostly cafes) were removed. Construction workers drilled and concreted 395 wells up to 24 meters. Their main task was to keep the soil from slipping. Cable car and viewing platforms were restored. 

In 2006, the mountain opened a recreational entertainment center, which was Kók Tóbe Park.

In the park there is a "fountain of desires" made in the shape of an apple. On the territory of the park there are playgrounds with slides, swings and different locations, a climbing wall, a children's playground, attractions, a Ferris wheel, and a rope park.

References

Notes

Almaty
Mountains of Kazakhstan